Antonio Viola (born 21 September 1990 in Potenza) is an Italian cyclist riding for Nippo–Vini Fantini.

References

1990 births
People from Potenza
Living people
Italian male cyclists
Cyclists from Basilicata
Sportspeople from the Province of Potenza